East Grimstead is a village in Grimstead civil parish, on the River Dun in Wiltshire, England, about  east of Salisbury. The village has about 70 households and no shops, public houses or schools.

History 
The site of a Roman villa is a short distance to the southeast of the village.

The Salisbury and Southampton Canal, opened in 1802 or 1803, passed to the south of the village on the south bank of the river; it was never completed as far as Salisbury and closed in 1806. The only surviving canal bridge carries the road south from East Grimstead, near the church.

In 1847 the London and South Western Railway opened its line between Bishopstoke in Hampshire and Milford station at Salisbury, passing East Grimshaw to the south of the canal.

Church 
The Church of England church of the Holy Trinity was built in 1857, replacing an earlier chapel. It is subordinate to St Mary's parish church at West Dean.

Local government 
Since 1934 the village has elected Grimstead parish council, together with West Grimstead. It is in the area of Wiltshire Council unitary authority, which performs all significant local government functions.

References

External links

 Grimstead Parish Council

Villages in Wiltshire